The Amazonas gubernatorial election will be held on 5 October 2014 to elect the next governor of the state of Amazonas. If no candidate receives more than 50% of the vote, a second-round runoff election will be held on 26 October.  Governor José Melo is running for his first full term after assuming the Governorship in April 2014.

References

October 2014 events in South America
Amazonas (Brazilian state) gubernatorial elections
2014 Brazilian gubernatorial elections